Tara Wallack (born July 2, 2003) is a Canadian basketball player. She competed at the 2022 Commonwealth Games, in 3x3 basketball, winning a gold medal.

She plays for Washington State University.

References 

2003 births
Living people
Canadian basketball players
Commonwealth Games medallists in basketball
Commonwealth Games gold medallists for Canada
Washington State Cougars women's basketball players
Medallists at the 2022 Commonwealth Games